Krasnogorsky (masculine), Krasnogorskaya (feminine), or Krasnogorskoye (neuter) may refer to:
Krasnogorsky District, several districts and city districts in Russia
Krasnogorsky Urban Settlement (or Krasnogorskoye Urban Settlement), several municipal urban settlements in Russia
Krasnogorsky (inhabited locality) (Krasnogorskaya, Krasnogorskoye), several inhabited localities in Russia

See also
Krasnogorsk (disambiguation)
Krasnaya Gora
Krasnogorsky Zavod, an optical and photography equipment factory in Moscow Oblast, Russia